Arts Plaza (also known as Center for the Arts Plaza) is a public plaza, park, and open-air venue in Gresham, Oregon.

Features
The Children's Fountain was added in 2014.

The plaza features Claudia Fitch's art installation Fine Tuned Tulle, which has four pillars representing dance, literature, music, and the visual arts in the form of a tutu, fountain pen, trumpet, and paint brush.

References

External links

 Arts Plaza at the City of Gresham, Oregon

Gresham, Oregon
Municipal parks in Oregon